(English: Tomorrow at dawn) is one of French writer Victor Hugo's most famous poems. It was published in his 1856 collection . It consists of three quatrains of rhyming alexandrines. The poem describes a visit to his daughter Léopoldine Hugo's grave four years after her death.

Text and translation

References

External links
 'Demain dès l'aube' by Victor Hugo (from ).

French poetry
Poetry by Victor Hugo